Flamarion Nunes Tomazolli (died 27 January 2020) was a Brazilian professional football player and manager.

References

Date of birth missing
2020 deaths
Brazilian footballers
Association football midfielders
Brazilian football managers
Al Sadd SC managers
Associação Atlética Ponte Preta managers
Avaí FC managers
Guarani FC managers
Brazilian expatriate football managers
Brazilian expatriate sportspeople in Qatar
Expatriate football managers in Qatar